Gregg Nibert (born July 20, 1957) is the former head men's basketball coach at Presbyterian College. He is the all-time winningest coach in Blue Hose history. He resigned April 12th, 2017 after 28 seasons as head coach.

Head coaching record

References

1957 births
Living people
College men's basketball head coaches in the United States
Furman Paladins men's basketball coaches
Marietta Pioneers men's basketball players
Presbyterian Blue Hose men's basketball coaches
Rice Owls men's basketball coaches